Robin and Marian is a 1976 British-American romantic adventure film from Columbia Pictures, shot in Panavision and Technicolor, that was directed by Richard Lester and written by James Goldman after the legend of Robin Hood. The film stars Sean Connery as Robin Hood, Audrey Hepburn as Lady Marian, Nicol Williamson as Little John, Robert Shaw as the Sheriff of Nottingham, Richard Harris as Richard the Lionheart, and Denholm Elliott as Will Scarlet. It also features comedian Ronnie Barker in a rare film role as Friar Tuck. Robin and Marian was filmed in Zamora, as well as Artajona, Urbasa, Quinto Real and Orgi, all small medieval villages in Navarre, Spain. It marked Hepburn's return to the screen after an eight-year absence.

Lester made Robin and Marian amid a series of period pieces, including The Three Musketeers (1973). The original music score was composed by John Barry. The film originally was titled The Death of Robin Hood but was changed by Columbia Pictures to be more marketable, and perhaps give equal billing to Hepburn.

It is the only theatrical film based on the Robin Hood legend that makes use of a very old story (found in A Gest of Robyn Hode) depicting his murder at the hands of a prioress he was related to but turns the legend on its head by making Marian the prioress, and making it an act of love, not betrayal.

Plot 
An ageing Robin Hood is a trusted captain fighting for King Richard the Lionheart in France, the Crusades long over. Richard orders him to take a castle that is rumoured to hold a gold statue. Discovering that it is defended by a solitary, one-eyed old man who is sheltering women and children, and being told that the statue is worthless stone, Robin and his right-hand man, Little John, refuse to attack. King Richard, angry at their insubordination, orders the pair's execution and the castle attacked, but is wounded with an arrow by the old man. Richard has the helpless residents massacred, with the exception of the old man, because Richard likes his eye. The King offers to let Robin beg for his life. When Robin refuses, Richard draws his sword, but having been wounded, lacks the strength to strike him and falls to the floor. Robin helps the dying king and, moved by his loyalty, Richard frees Robin and Little John.

Robin and Little John return to England and are reunited with old friends Will Scarlet and Friar Tuck in Sherwood Forest. He hears that his exploits have become legendary. When Robin casually inquires about Maid Marian, they tell him she is still alive and where she lives. When he goes to see her, she finds him as impossible as ever, while he discovers that she has become an abbess. He learns that his old nemesis, the Sheriff of Nottingham, has ordered her arrest in response to King John's order to expel senior leaders of the Roman Catholic Church from England.

When the Sheriff comes to arrest Marian, Marian wants no trouble, but Robin rescues her against her will, striking Sir Ranulf, the Sheriff's arrogant guest, in the process. He also later rescues the nuns, who have been locked in the Sheriff's castle. Ignoring the Sheriff's warnings, Sir Ranulf pursues Robin into the forest. His men are ambushed and a number killed by arrows; Sir Ranulf is left unharmed only because Robin orders him spared. When the news of Robin's return spreads, old comrades and new recruits rally once more to him. Sir Ranulf asks King John for 200 soldiers to deal with Robin.

The Sheriff waits in the fields beyond the Forest, knowing Robin will be unable to resist indefinitely the temptation to attack, despite the open terrain, which is unfavourable for Robin's untrained and greatly outnumbered men against the King's trained soldiers. When Robin does, he proposes that he and the Sheriff fight by single combat to settle the issue, despite the protests of Sir Ranulf. Although Robin appears to be stronger at the start of the fight, it becomes clear that the Sheriff is more than a match for him. Eventually, the Sheriff has the wounded Robin at his mercy and demands his surrender. Refusing, Robin manages to kill the Sheriff with the last of his strength. Led by Sir Ranulf, the soldiers attack and scatter Robin's ragtag band, many of whom are captured or killed. Will Scarlet and Friar Tuck are captured but Little John manages to kill Sir Ranulf. John and Marian take Robin to her abbey, where she keeps her medicine.

Robin believes he will recover to win future battles. Little John stands guard outside while Marian tends to Robin's wounds. Marian prepares a draught of medicine and drinks some herself before giving it to Robin. He drinks it and notes that the pain has gone away and his legs have gone numb. Realizing that she has poisoned them both, he cries out for Little John. However, he comes to understand that Marian has acted out of love because he would never be the same man again, before admitting she loves him.

Robin and Marian try to touch each other's hands as Little John crashes through the door and weeps at Robin's bedside. Robin asks Little John for his bow and shoots an arrow from his deathbed through the open window, and tells him to bury them both where it lands. The arrow soars out of the window into the distance. Apples are seen decaying on the windowsill.

Cast

 Sean Connery as Robin Hood
 Audrey Hepburn as Marian/Mother Jennet
 Robert Shaw as the Sheriff of Nottingham
 Nicol Williamson as Little John
 Richard Harris as Richard the Lionheart
 Denholm Elliott as Will Scarlet
 Ronnie Barker as Friar Tuck
 Kenneth Haigh as Sir Ranulf de Pudsey
 Ian Holm as King John
 Bill Maynard as Mercadier
 Esmond Knight as Old Defender
 Veronica Quilligan as Sister Mary
 Peter Butterworth as Surgeon
 John Barrett as Jack
 Kenneth Cranham as Jack's Apprentice
 Victoria Abril as Queen Isabella

Reception
The film generally received positive reviews by critics on its release. 

Roger Ebert was positive towards Connery and Hepburn as Robin and Marian, although he was uncertain about "history repeating itself" in regard to the plot. According to Ebert, "What prevents the movie from really losing its way, though, are the performances of Sean Connery and Audrey Hepburn in the title roles. No matter what the director and the writer may think, Connery and Hepburn seem to have arrived at a tacit understanding between themselves about their characters. They glow. They really do seem in love. And they project as marvelously complex, fond, tender people; the passage of 20 years has given them grace and wisdom." He also approved of the film's cinematography when compared to early films of the genre, noting that "Lester photographs them with more restraint than he might have used 10 years ago. His active camera is replaced here by a visual tempo more suited to bittersweet nostalgia. He photographs Sherwood Forest and its characters with a nice off-hand realism that's better than the pretentious solemnity we sometimes get in historical pictures". Time Out also gave the film a positive review. Time Out stated "There are quite a few typical Lester gags on the fringes of its tale...but the movie is conceived and executed in an elegiac key (not unlike Siegel's The Shootist), and played with an unfashionable depth of feeling (especially by Connery and Hepburn, both terrific)".

The film is recognized by American Film Institute in these lists:
 2002: AFI's 100 Years ... 100 Passions – Nominated

See also 
 List of adventure films of the 1970s
 List of American films of 1976
 List of historical drama films

References

External links 
 
 
 
 
 

1976 films
1970s adventure drama films
1976 romantic drama films
American adventure drama films
American romantic drama films
British adventure films
British romantic drama films
Columbia Pictures films
Films directed by Richard Lester
Films scored by John Barry (composer)
Films set in England
Films set in France
Films set in Spain
Films shot in England
Films shot in France
Films shot in Spain
Films set in castles
Films with screenplays by James Goldman
Murder–suicide in films
Province of Zamora
Films set in the 1190s
Robin Hood films
Love stories
Cultural depictions of Richard I of England
Cultural depictions of John, King of England
1970s English-language films
1970s American films
1970s British films